Biblical gardens are cultivated collections of plants that are named in the Bible. They are a type of theme garden that botanical gardens, public parks, and private gardeners maintain. They are grown in many parts of the world, with many examples far from the Levant, including the Seinan Gakuin University Biblical Botanical Garden in Fukoka, Japan, and the Missouri Botanical Garden in St. Louis, Missouri, in the United States.

A list of plants in the Bible includes species of plants mentioned in the Jewish and Christian scriptures. There is considerable uncertainty regarding the identity of some plants mentioned in the Bible, so some Biblical gardens may display more than one candidate species. Other plants with associations to the themes and subjects of the Bible are sometimes also included, especially in areas with different climates. Additionally, some gardens exhibit objects in order to illustrate Biblical stories or to demonstrate how people lived in Biblical times.

Noteworthy Biblical gardens

Israel
Yad Hashmona Biblical Garden
Neot Kedumim
Jerusalem Botanical Gardens

Europe
 Elgin Cathedral
 Le Jardin du Livre - Valff 67210 (France) internet site

United States

 Huntsville Botanical Garden, Huntsville, Alabama
 Rodef Shalom Biblical Botanical Garden, Pittsburgh, Pennsylvania
 Warsaw, Indiana
 San Francisco Botanical Garden
 Missouri Botanical Garden
 Fair Haven Biblical Garden, Fair Haven, Vermont
 Cathedral of Saint John the Divine, New York
 Tree of life garden, Valley Center, California
 Museum of the Bible, Washington, D.C., rooftop garden

Japan
 Seinan Gakuin University Biblical Botanical Garden

References

External links

 Biblical Botanical Gardens Society Biblical Botanical Gardens Society- USA
 Materializing the Bible provides a comprehensive list of Biblical gardens

Gardens
Gardens in religion
Botanical gardens
Types of garden
Bible-themed museums, zoos, and botanical gardens